American Ammayi is a 1999 Indian Malayalam film,  directed by G. K. Gouthaman. The film stars Jagathy Sreekumar, KPAC Lalitha, Kalpana and Prem Kumar in the lead roles. The film has musical score by Sanjeev Lal.

Cast
Jagathy Sreekumar as C. M. Sugunan
KPAC Lalitha as Sharada Nair, Devan's mother 
Kalpana as Thresia
Prem Kumar as Devan
Chandni Shaju as Sridevi
Janardanan as Menon
Indrans as Kuttapan
Poojappura Ravi as Keshu Nair
Sindhu as Diana
Philomina as Naani
 Kaviyoor Renuka as mother of Sridevi

Soundtrack
The music was composed by Sanjeev Lal and the lyrics were written by Bharanikkavu Sivakumar.

References

External links
 

1999 films
1990s Malayalam-language films